Lakes on Eldridge is an unincorporated area in northwest Harris County, Texas, in Greater Houston. There is an adjacent subdivision, Lakes on Eldridge North.

It is adjacent to the Barker Reservoir and Cullen Park and is in proximity to the Houston Energy Corridor. It is equidistant to both Bush Intercontinental Airport and William P. Hobby Airport.

History
Lakes on Eldridge opened in 1995 while Lakes on Eldridge North opened in 2000, with building out completed in 2006.

Transportation
Nearby major freeways include Beltway 8 (Sam Houston Parkway), Interstate 10, and U.S. Highway 290.

Composition
Pocket parks serve sections of the community, and it also has a volleyball court, a clubhouse, an Olympic-sized swimming pool, and tennis courts with lighting.

Lakes on Eldridge North has over 1,000 houses. It has a fitness center, a playground, and a volleyball court. It also has three tennis courts with lighting and two swimming pools.

Education
The community is within the Cypress-Fairbanks Independent School District, and is zoned to Shirley Kirk Elementary School, Truitt Middle School, and Cypress Ridge High School. Kirk Elementary, named after teacher Shirley Kirk (October 8, 1930-February 11, 2015), opened in 2000. The namesake worked for the district until she retired in 1994.

Awty International School, which includes Houston's French international school; and the British International School of Houston, maintain school bus services to Lakes on Eldridge.  The Village School also has a bus service to/from Lakes on Eldridge and Lakes on Eldridge North.

Areas in Cy-Fair ISD (and therefore Lakes on Eldridge) are located in Lone Star College.

References

External links
 Lakes on Eldridge
 Lakes on Eldridge North Community Association
 Kirk Elementary School

Harris County, Texas